Amroha district is one of the 75 districts of Uttar Pradesh state in northern India. Amroha town is the district headquarters.  According to the Government of India, the district is one of the Minority Concentrated Districts on the basis of the 2001 census data on population, socio-economic indicators and basic amenities indicators.

The district is bounded on the north by Bijnor District, on the east and southeast by Moradabad District, on the south by Badaun District, and on the west by the River Ganges, across which lie the Bulandshahr, Hapur, and Meerut districts. State Highways 72 and 73 penetrate the city and act as major routes.

History
The Battle of Amroha was fought between the Mongols and Alauddin Khilji on 20 December 1305. Alauddin won the battle. Later, the territory occupied by the present district was part of the Sambhal sarkar of Delhi subah under the Mughal empire. Later it came under the control of Awadh. In 1801, the administration of this territory was ceded to the British East India Company by the Nawab of Awadh. On 24 April 1997, this district was carved out by separating Amroha, Dhanora and Hasanpur tehsils of the erstwhile Moradabad district. In 2012, this district was renamed from Jyotiba Phule Nagar district to Amroha district.

Demographics

According to the 2011 census 'Amroha District' has a population of 1,840,221, roughly equal to the nation of Kosovo or the US state of Nebraska. This gives it a ranking of 258th in India (out of a total of 640). Its population growth rate over the decade 2001-2011 was 22.66%. Amroha has a sex ratio of 907 females for every 1,000 males, and a literacy rate of 65.7%. Scheduled Castes make up 17.28% of the population.

Religion

Even though the district is Hindu majority, Muslims form a significant minority and dominate urban areas. As per the 2011 census out of 9 Census towns Muslims are majority in 7 while Hindus are majority in Gajraula (77.33%) and Dhanaura (66.38%) towns.

Language

At the time of the 2011 Census of India, 80.10% of the population of the district spoke Hindi and 19.70% Urdu as their first language.

Notable people 
 Kalpana Iyer, Famous TV actress
 Ahmad Hasan Amrohi, Islamic scholar
 Kamal Amrohi, filmmaker, lyricist, actor, director, husband of Meena Kumari
 Jaun Elia, poet and columnist
 Mohammad Shami, cricketer
 Syed Sadequain Ahmed Naqvi, artist
 Dr Naseem uz Zafar Baquiri, poet, lyricist, doctor
 Iqbal Mehdi, artist
 Nawab Waqar ul Mulk, educationalist, politician
 K.A. Nizami, historian
 Nisar Ahmed Faruqi, Education
 Mashhoor Amrohi, Actor
 Shandar Amrohi, Actor, Film Maker
 Tajdar Amrohi, Actor, Film Maker
 Saiyed Zegham Murtaza, Journalist, Columnist, Author, Blogger and Documentary Film Maker
 Faraz Haider, Director, Actor, Film Maker
 Waseem Amrohi, Entrepreneur and Digital Media Marketer
 Dr. Azeem Amrohvi, Poet and Critic
 Kafeel Azar Amrohi, Urdu Poet
 Bhuvnesh Chandra Sharma, Bhuvan Amrohi, Urdu Poet, Writer

Media
University in Amroha has several active media groups which continuously give the populace Hindi news updates on Amroha:
Amar Ujala 
Dainik Bhaskar
Dainik Jagran
Awam-e-hind
Amroha ki Ekta(Hindi Weekly newspaper)

References

External links
 

Rickard, J (7 April 2010), Battle of Amroha, 20 December 1305, historyofwar.org

 
Districts of Uttar Pradesh
Minority Concentrated Districts in India